Guraleus cuspis is a species of sea snail, a marine gastropod mollusk in the family Mangeliidae.

Subspecies
 Guraleus (Guraleus) cuspis connectens (G.B. Sowerby, III, 1897) (synonym: Mangilia connectens G.B. Sowerby III, 1896)

Description
The length of the shell attains 8.5 mm, its diameter 3 mm.

(Original description) The white, fusiform shell is acuminate on both sides. It contains 8 whorls, of which 3 polished whorls n the protoconch. The others are obtusely angulate and crossed by many spiral lirae. The shell shows many opisthocline ribs. The body whorl is at the top slightly concave, but otherwise slightly convex. The columella is delicately contorted. The aperture is elongated. The outer lip is thin and backwards slightly sinuate.
.

Distribution
This marine species is endemic to Australia and can be found off South Australia, Tasmania, Victoria and Western Australia

References

 Verco, J.C. 1909. Notes on South Australian marine Mollusca with descriptions of new species. Part XII. Transactions of the Royal Society of South Australia 33: 293–342

External links
  Tucker, J.K. 2004 Catalog of recent and fossil turrids (Mollusca: Gastropoda). Zootaxa 682:1–1295.

cuspis
Gastropods described in 1896
Gastropods of Australia